Rudolf Falb (born 14 April 1838 in Obdach (Styria, Austrian Empire; died 29 September 1903 in Schöneberg, German Empire) was an Austrian popularizer of natural history who concerned himself with earthquakes, meteorology, astronomy and also with evolutionary linguistics. He developed the lunisolar flood hypothesis of earthquakes and volcanism, based on the concept of subterranean lava tides, which the academic community thoroughly refuted even during his lifetime; nevertheless he attained considerable popularity through apparently correct predictions of several seismic events. Falb's lasting legacy is that he popularized the concept of extraterrestrial influences of geophysical phenomena, even though his concepts regarding the origins of earthquakes were wrong.

Priest and teacher 

Falb, a miller's son, attended school at St. Lambrecht's Abbey and then studied theology at the University of Graz. He was ordained as a Catholic priest in 1862 and briefly served as a chaplain in Kainach bei Voitsberg and then in pastoral care. However he soon became a teacher for religion and German language at the merchants' academy in Graz where Peter Rosegger was one of his pupils. Falb became estranged from Catholicism during this time, renouncing his priesthood in 1866. (He converted to Protestantism in 1872).

The lunisolar flood theory 

Falb relocated to Prague where he obtained a tutor position in a noble family. This supplied him with sufficient funds to study mathematics, physics and astronomy at the Charles University, and later geology at the University of Vienna. There is no record of him having obtained an academic degree at either institution.

In 1868 Falb started the popular astronomy magazine, Sirius and began to develop his "lunisolar flood theory", published in 1869. A central point of this hypothesis stated earthquakes to be caused by tidal forces acting on subterranean lakes of lava (causing earthquakes) and its upwelling through the earth's crust (causing volcanic eruptions). The strength of these forces being predictable from the positions of the sun and the moon relative to each  other, Falb proceeded to postulate "Critical Days" during which geophysical disasters should be more likely to occur. Subsequently he extended this hypothesis, which initially had strong connections to ideas put forward by the French mathematician Alexis Perrey, to include long-term weather forecasting. Falb's hypothesis gained a high public profile when he made predictions that seemed to come true with the 1873 Belluno earthquake and an eruption at Mount Aetna in 1874.

However, the fundamental flaws of this hypothesis were the typical ones that disqualify it as a scientific theory—namely, insufficient specificity and precision of the predictions in relation to statistically expected levels, and inherent irrefutability, the combined effect being non-falsifiability. Falb considered days on which the moon was either full or new or in its nodal positions (i.e., four days per month) to be "Critical Days." To this were added the days of the equinox (2 per year), and the days when Earth was in the apical positions of its orbit (2 per year). Because Falb proceeded to claim each of these days to be preceded and followed by 2–3 days which he also considered critical (though less so), about a third of all days of the year met some criteria of "criticality" according to the lunisolar hypothesis. Moreover, by stating the actual occurrence of the predicted events not to be mandatory, Falb immunized himself against failures while he could (and would) always claim successes as being in support of his hypothesis—a characteristic hallmark of predictions in pseudoscience.

Falb also met the most determined resistance from the scientific establishment on geophysical grounds. Among his most determined and outspoken academic opponents were one of the founders of seismotectonics, Rudolf Hoernes in Graz, the director of the Austrian Meteorological Service, Josef M. Pernter in Innsbruck, and the British inventor of the modern seismograph, John Milne.

This formidable and sustained scientific opposition notwithstanding, Falb influenced public opinion regarding seismic phenomena to such a degree that the two major German encyclopedias - the Brockhaus Enzyklopädie and Meyers Konversations-Lexikon - both mentioned Falb and his theory in editions published during the late 19th century. He also gained a degree of notability in the English-speaking world. In London Murray's Magazine published an appraisal of his earthquake predictions which was reprinted by The New York Times.

Linguistic hypotheses 

In 1877 Falb traveled in South America to study volcanic phenomena and became so fascinated with the native ethnic culture that he stayed much longer than he had planned. While in Bolivia he became a favorite of president Hilarión Daza but had to leave the country when Daza was removed from office in 1879. After interludes in California and New York, Falb returned to Austria but then moved on to Leipzig where he married Petrine von Labitschburg, a primary school teacher. There he opened up another front of controversy in 1883–1888 when he published books on the Inca civilization, postulating languages such as Aimara and Quechua to be the "original languages of mankind" and linking them to the Semitic languages. These writings did not gain the broad publicity which the lunisolar flood theory continued to enjoy.

Final years 

Although increasingly affected by a paralytic spinal disease, Falb continued to publish "Critical Day" calendars (from 1888 onward) and other writings which became increasingly eccentric, including deluge myths and ice ages. With his wife and their five children he spent the following 15 years under increasingly dire economic conditions relocating between Berlin, his native town Obdach, Leipzig, and finally Berlin again where Rudolf Falb died in 1903, at an age of 65 years.

References

Further reading 
 Andreas Daum, Wissenschaftspopularisierung im 19. Jahrhundert: Bürgerliche Kultur, naturwissenschaftliche Bildung und die deutsche Öffentlichkeit, 1848–1914. Munich: Oldenbourg, 1998,  (2nd. ed. 2002), pp. 173–74, 360, 385, 388, 391, 403, 405, 457, 485, including a short biography.
 Heller HG. Rudolf Falb. Eine Charakterskizze nach persönlichen Erinnerungen. 1903, Friedrich Gottheiner (Berlin-Charlottenburg) 31 p.
 Biography of Rudolf Falb on the Obdach website (German)
  (Theosophist, May, 1861)

External links

 Extreme volcanism - tides of the liquid core University of Vienna website on historical earthquake theories Archived

1838 births
1903 deaths
People from Murtal District
Pseudo-scholarship
Austrian male writers
University of Graz alumni
Converts to Protestantism from Roman Catholicism